Re MC Bacon Ltd [1990] BCLC 324 is a leading UK insolvency law case, concerning transactions at an undervalue (Insolvency Act 1986, s 238) and voidable preferences (Insolvency Act 1986, s 239).

The court held that where a person granting security to a bank under commercial pressure from the bank, there was no "intention to prefer" the bank under the meaning in the Act.  The granting of the security was a response to the commercial pressure, and not an intention to prefer one creditor above others.

Although the decision is only a first instance decision in the United Kingdom, it has been followed in a number of other jurisdictions in relation to the proper determination of intention to prefer.

Facts
MC Bacon Ltd imported bacon, its main office on 192-194 Trundley’s Road, London. Started in 1973 it did normal bacon and then from 1983 diversified into gammon steaks, joints and rashered bacon. But in 1986 Dee Corporation, its principal supplier withdrew. Two directors, Mr Creal and Mr Glover took legal advice but decided to keep trading. It made redundancies but still could not keep up. Mr Creal was old and wanted his son to take over. Mr Glover was 22.5 stone and had arthritis and could not do the work with his previous vitality. In May 1986 its bank, NatWest, granted an overdraft facility, secured with a debenture. It was clear that the company was already insolvent and needed the bank’s help to keep going. The company went into creditor voluntary liquidation in August 1987 with a deficiency of about £330,000 to unsecured creditors. The liquidator argued the debenture was either a voidable preference or transaction at an undervalue. It also brought a wrongful trading claim against the bank as a shadow director, but that claim was abandoned during the course of trial.

The bank had applied to have the entire claim struck out as disclosing no reasonable cause of action.  That strike out application came before Knox J.  He declined to strike out the claim, and it proceeded to trial before Millet J.  The hearing before Millet J lasted 17 days.

Judgment
Millett J held that the company and its directors had not done anything in contravention of sections 238 or 239. A transaction that results in preferential status for one creditor is only voidable under section 239 if a company positively wishes, or desires, to prefer that creditor, and that desire influences entering the transaction. Here the directors did not want to improve the bank's position, but simply wished to continue trading. The creation of the security in favour of the bank was not a transaction at an undervalue within the meaning of section 238 because it did not deplete or diminish the value of the assets of the company. His judgment went as follows.

Significance
This case was one of the earliest decided cases under new provisions of the Insolvency Act 1986. In a subsequent case, Re MC Bacon Ltd (No 2) Millett J went on to further important clarifications as the context and effect of the provisions and how to deal with the proceeds of anything recovered under s 214 (for the purposes of whether the costs were an expense of the liquidation under rule 4.218(1)(a)). Therefore, any recovery would not go to secured creditors.

See also

UK insolvency law
Re Agriplant Services Ltd [1997] 2 BCLC 598

Notes

References

United Kingdom insolvency case law
High Court of Justice cases
1989 in British law
1989 in case law